Jefferson's can refer to:

 A nickname for the United States two-dollar bill, featuring Thomas Jefferson
 Jefferson's Bourbon, a Kentucky distilled bourbon whiskey

See also 

 Jefferson (disambiguation)